Britain's Bloodiest Dynasty is a British television documentary about the Plantagenets presented by Dan Jones and first broadcast from 27 November to 18 December 2014. The four-part documentary follows the period from Henry II to Richard II.

The four-part Channel 5 (UK) was an adaptation of Jones's  book The Plantagenets: The Warrior Kings and Queens Who Made England (2012,).

Episode list

References

External links
 

2014 British television series debuts
2014 British television series endings
2010s British documentary television series
Channel 5 (British TV channel) original programming
2010s British television miniseries
Documentaries about historical events
English-language television shows
Television series about the history of England